"Spank Thru" is a song by the American rock band Nirvana, written by vocalist and guitarist Kurt Cobain. It appears on the compilation album Sub Pop 200, released in December 1988.

Though rarely performed live beyond the first few years of the band's existence, the song is significant in that it helped lead to the formation of Nirvana by helping convince bassist Krist Novoselic to start a band with Cobain. Novoselic specifically referred to the song as "the first Nirvana song" in the liner notes to the live compilation album From the Muddy Banks of the Wishkah, released in October 1996.

Origin and recording

Early history

"Spank Thru" dates back to 1985, when it was included on the demo tape Illiteracy Will Prevail released by Cobain's short-lived band, Fecal Matter. Novoselic, who lived in Cobain's hometown of Aberdeen, Washington, later claimed that hearing this version, which featured Melvins drummer Dale Crover on drums and backing vocals, led to him forming what would become Nirvana with Cobain. "One of the songs on [the tape] was 'Spank Thru,'" Novoselic told Kurt St. Thomas in 1992. "He turned me on to it, and I really liked it, it kind of got me excited. So I go, 'Hey man, let's start a band.'" The Fecal Matter version of "Spank Thru" missed inclusion on the band's rarities box set, With the Lights Out, in November 2004, but was one of three previously unreleased recordings that appeared on the box set highlights compilation, Sliver: The Best of the Box, in November 2005.

"Spank Thru" was among the songs performed at Nirvana's first live performance, at a house party in Raymond, Washington in March 1987.

The song was also performed during the band's first radio session, on May 6, 1987, at The Evergreen State College in Olympia, Washington for KAOS (FM). The band, then called "Skid Row," featured Aaron Burckhard on drums, along with Cobain and Novoselic.

It was first recorded in the studio during Nirvana's first studio session, by Jack Endino at Reciprocal Recording on January 23, 1988. As with the Fecal Matter version, this recording features Crover on drums and backing vocals.

Sub Pop 200

A second version was recorded by Endino several months later at the same location, this time featuring the band's new drummer Chad Channing on drums and Endino on backing vocals. This version was released on the compilation album Sub Pop 200 in December, 1988. The album, which was released to promote the Seattle-based Sub Pop record label and showcase the emerging "grunge" scene, was released shortly after the band's two-song debut single, "Love Buzz," making "Spank Thru" the third Nirvana song to be officially released.

Post-Sub Pop 200

On October 26, 1989, the band recorded a version of "Spank Thru" during their first BBC Peel Session, at Maida Vale Studios in London, England.

A live version, recorded at the Pine Street Theatre in Portland, Oregon on February 9, 1990, was released on the British 12-inch and CD versions of the "Sliver" single in 1991.

The final live performance of "Spank Thru" was at the Estadio José Amalfitani in Buenos Aires, Argentina on October 30, 1992.

Composition

Music

Tim Hughes called the song "an interesting composite of two very different parts," with an "opening guitar riff that satirizes "The Great White Buffalo" by Ted Nugent" and lyrics that "mock the sentimental love poetry" of 70s arena rock bands, before it "abruptly shifts gears into a high-energy punk rock about masturbation."

Lyrics

"Spank Thru" contains numerous references to masturbation. Amanda Petrusich of Pitchfork described it as "a charming ode to jerking off," while Everett True called it "a paean to masturbation."

Reception
In 2015, Rolling Stone listed the song at number 54 on their ranking of 102 Nirvana songs.

Other releases

A full-band rehearsal demo from December 1988, filmed above a hair salon in Aberdeen owned by Krist's mother, Maria Novoselic, appeared on the DVD of With the Lights Out.
The full Pine Street show, including "Spank Thru," was included on the 20th anniversary "Deluxe" edition of Bleach in November 2009.
A live version, recorded at Castello Vi de Porta, Castello 41 in Rome, Italy on November 19, 1991, appeared on The Muddy Banks of the Wishkah.
A live version, recorded during the band's headlining set at the 1992 Reading Festival in Reading, England, appeared on Live at Reading, released on CD and DVD in November 2009.

Unreleased versions

The first studio demo, recorded by Endino at Reciprocal on January 23, 1988, has never been officially released.
The version recorded for the BBC in London on October 26, 1989, also remains unreleased.

References 

Masturbation in fiction
Nirvana (band) songs
Songs written by Kurt Cobain